Singlet may refer to:
 singlet state, in theoretical physics, a quantum state with zero spin
 Singlet fission, in molecular photophysics
 in spectroscopy, an entity appearing as a single peak; see NMR spectroscopy
 in optics, a single lens element, the building blocks of lens systems; see lens (optics)
 a one-piece collarless garment, also known as a sleeveless shirt or vest
 wrestling singlet, a one-piece garment specific to wrestling
 BID/60, a British encryption machine
 Singlet oxygen, the common name used for an excited form of molecular oxygen